Cidinho and Doca (in Portuguese Cidinho e Doca, also as Cidinho & Doca) is a Rio de Janeiro-based Brazilian rap duo made up of Sidney da Silva (MC Cidinho) and Marcos Paulo de Jesus Peizoto (MC Doca), two "proibidão" rappers.

Rapping career 

"Proibidão" refers to songs whose airplay is legally prohibited in Brazil due to alleged crime apology and promotion of drugs and arms usage. The duo are known for their rendition of "Rap das Armas", a 1990s song originally by Junior e Leonardo, a song that also appeared on the soundtrack of the film Elite Squad (in Portuguese Tropa de Elite), the highest-grossing film of 2007 in Brazil.

The song illustrates the daily invasion of favelas by the elite squad of the Brazilian police in order to fight crime and drug trafficking. Despite its popularity, "Rap das Armas" was never played on the Brazilian radio and was removed from the film's soundtrack album two weeks after its release, because it allegedly praises weapons and lawlessness.

Cidinho and Doca became very popular internationally through a series of remixes of their song "Rap das Armas". Originally a hit in Portugal in 2008, it became a hit all over Europe. A remix made by DJ Quintino reached the number-one spot in both the Dutch Singles Chart in February 2009. The song also reached the top of the Swedish Singles Chart in summer of 2009.

Discography

Albums
 1995: Eu Só Quero É Ser Feliz
 1998: É O Bonde da C.D.D
 2000: Desarme-se
 2008: Rap das Armas

Singles
1994: "Rap das Armas" (in Brazil)
1995: "Rap da Felicidade" (in Brazil)
2008: "Rap das Armas" (in Europe)
2009: "Rap das Armas (Lucano Radio Mix)"

References

External links 
 Cidinho-Doca Site  Fans

Brazilian rappers
Hip hop duos